6HP is ZF Friedrichshafen AG's trademark name for its six-speed automatic transmission models (6-speed transmission with Hydraulic converter and Planetary gearsets) for longitudinal engine applications, designed and built by ZF's subsidiary in Saarbrücken. Released as the 6HP26 in 2000, it was the first six-speed automatic transmission in a production passenger car. Other variations of the first generation 6HP in addition to the 6HP26, were 6HP19, and 6HP32 having lower and higher torque capacity, respectively. In 2007, the second generation of the 6HP series was introduced, with models 6HP21 and 6HP28. A 6HP34 was planned, but never went into production.

The 6HP uses a Lepelletier epicyclic/planetary gearset, which can provide more gear ratios with significantly fewer components. This means the 6HP26 is actually lighter than its five-speed 5HP predecessors. It also has the capability to achieve torque converter lock-up on all six forward gears, and disengage it completely when at a standstill, dramatically closing the fuel efficiency gap between automatic and manual transmissions.

The last 6HP automatic transmission was produced by the Saarbrücken plant in March 2014 after 7,050,232 units were produced. The ZF plant in Shanghai continued to produce the 6HP for the Chinese market.

Specifications

Preliminary Note

All ZF 6HP gearboxes have the same gear ratios as the 6R60 and 6R80 gearboxes for passenger cars from Ford. Deviant gear ratios indicate another manufacturer as shown in the template.

New Paradigm

The 6HP is the first transmission designed according to ZF's new paradigm. After gaining additional gear ratios only with additional components, this time the number of components has to decrease for the first time in spite of the necessity of even more ratios. Coming from 5 gear ratios made of 10 main components (gear sets, Ravigneaux considered as 2, brakes, clutches) to the 6 made of 8 now reflects, what major progress the Lepelletier gear mechanism means compared to conventional designs like the 5HP-family.

Technical data

Technical imperfections

Problems with this transmission are well known. This transmission locks up the torque converter in all gears, increasing wear. Combined with a sealed transmission pan and "lifetime fluid", some people have experienced catastrophic transmission failure. Owners report shift issues when oil begins breaking down beyond 50K miles, hence shifting issues are common.

There are also problems with the valve block and solenoids. When this failure starts to occur, shift quality and speed, torque transfer and even loss of ability to engage gears can occur. These problems led Volkswagen Group to extend the warranty on all of their vehicles equipped with this transmission to 100,000 miles or 10 years.

First generation

6HP19 
The 6HP19 transmission was a development of the original 6HP26, but was downgraded for less demanding applications.

Applications
Rear-wheel drive cars:
 BMW X3
 BMW 520i (E60)
 BMW 528i (E60)
 BMW 530i, (E60)
 BMW 630i, (E63)
 BMW 730i/li, (E65/E66) 
 BMW 318i, 320i, 325i, 328i, 330i, 335i (E9X), pre-LCI
 BMW 116i, 118i, 120i (E87), pre-LCI, 135i (E82), 118d (E81)
 BMW Z4 E85 LCI, E86 
 Hyundai Genesis Coupe - 2010-2012 3.8L

6HP19A 
It was used by the Volkswagen Group for some permanent four-wheel drive models.

Applications
 Audi (B6) A4/S4 (Typ 8E/8H)
 Audi (B7) A4/S4 (Typ 8E/8H)
 VW Phaeton (Typ 3D)
 Audi A6 (Typ C6/4F) 3.0 TDI / 3.2 FSI / 3.0 TFSI
 Audi A8 (Typ D3/4E) 3.0 TDI / 3.2 FSI

6HP26 
The 6HP26 was the original variation of the 6HP, released in 2000. It was first used by the BMW 7 Series (E65) in 2001. Initially only used by premium brands, it was later available on the 2009 model year V8 Hyundai Genesis.

Several versions of the 6HP26 are available depending on application and brand: 6HP26, 6HP26A and 6HP26X.

Applications
Ford has developed their own versions (6R60 and 6R80) based on the 6HP26. Therefore, certain Ford vehicles will not be listed.

Two-wheel drive version:
 2001–2008 BMW 7 Series (E65) 735i, 745i, 760i, 730d and 740d
 2002–2005 Jaguar XK8/XKR (X100)
 2003–2012 Aston Martin DB9
 2003–2010 BMW 5 Series (E60)
 2003–2010 BMW 6 Series (E63) (Pre-LCI models, 645i / 650i / 635d)
 2009–2012 Hyundai Genesis Sedan (4.6L V8)
 2003–2008 Jaguar S-Type
 2003–2009 Jaguar XJ (X350)
 2003–2012 Rolls-Royce Phantom
 2005–2011 BMW 3 Series (E90, E92)
 2005–2016 Ford Falcon (BF, FG, FG X turbocharged inline-six and V8) Although production of the transmission ended in 2014, Ford retained sufficient inventory to last until end of Falcon production in 2016.
 2005–2014 Ford Territory (SY AWD; SZ petrol)
 2006–2010 Jaguar XK/XKR (X150)
 2007–2019 Maserati GranTurismo
 2007–2012 Maserati Quattroporte
 2007–present Rolls-Royce Phantom Drophead Coupé
 2008–2012 Aston Martin DBS V12
 2008–2012 BMW 7 Series (F01), except 740d xDrive, 760i/Li and Hybrid 7
 2008–2011 Kia Mohave
 2008–2012 Jaguar XF (X250)
 2006–2009 Bentley Arnage
 2008–2011 Bentley Brooklands
 2010–2014 Aston Martin Rapide
 2011 Hyundai Equus
 2011-2012 Aston Martin Virage
 2012-2014 Aston Martin Vanquish

6HP26A 
The 6HP26A is a variation of the 6HP26 for four-wheel drive applications. It was used by the Volkswagen Group for some permanent four-wheel drive models and packages a TORSEN type center differential, and open front differential into the transmission assembly.

Applications
 2003–2009 Audi A8 (D3, Typ 4E)
 2006–2009 Audi S8 (D3, Typ 4E)
 2003–2011 Bentley Continental GT
 2005–2013 Bentley Flying Spur
 2006–2011 Audi S6 (C6, Typ 4F)
 2008–2010 Audi RS6 (C6, Typ 4F)

6HP26X & 6HP26Z 
The 6HP26X and 6HP26Z is another variation of the 6HP26, also for four-wheel drive applications. This transmission is suitable for 4WDs with a separate transfer box (the "X" stands for external 4WD).

Applications
 2006–2013 Land Rover Range Rover (All with Jaguar type engines or TDV8)
 2006–2013 Land Rover Range Rover Sport (4.4-litre and 5.0-litre AJV8 models)
 2005–2009 Land Rover Discovery 3 (LR3 in North America)
 2010–2013 Land Rover Discovery 4 (LR4 in North America)
 2007 BMW X3 (E83) 3.0d (some models)
 2005–2011 BMW 330(x)d xDrive (E90/91)
 2004–2006 BMW X5 (E53) V8 and 3.0D (6HP26Z)
 2007–2013 BMW X5 (E70) (some facelift models use 8HP)
 2007 BMW 6 Series (e63/64)
 2007-2010 BMW 5 series LCI(530d xdrive)
 2003 BMW 7 series E65 745i

6HP32 
The 6HP32 is a variation of the 6HP26 for high-output applications.

Applications
 BMW E65 745d (LCI)
Volkswagen Phaeton 5.0 V10 TDi (6HP-32A, internal 4x4)
Audi Q7 4L V12 TDI

Second generation

6HP21 
The 6HP21 was a variation of the 6HP produced in the PRC. It is also alternatively known as 6HP19tu and 6HP19z.

Applications
 2011-2014 Ford Falcon (FG2 turbocharged inline-four, naturally-aspirated inline-six, turbocharged inline-six and supercharge V8)
 2014–2016 Ford Falcon (FG X turbocharged inline-four, naturally-aspirated inline-six, turbocharged inline-six and supercharged V8 )
 2014–2016 Ford Territory (SZ II petrol)
 2010-2012 BMW 320d Lci (Thailand) (Engine N47D20)
 2011-2013 BMW 335i (E9X)
 2013-2015 BMW X1 (E84) xDrive35i
 2009 LCI (BMW 528i E60) (Engine: N52B30AE)

6HP28  
(also known as BMW GA6HP26Z) The 6HP28 was the second generation of the 6HP gearbox, introduced in mid-2006.

Applications
Two-wheel drive version:
 2009–2012 Jaguar XF (X250)
 2009-2014 Jaguar XK (X150)
 2010-2012 Jaguar XJ (X351)
 2010-2013 BMW E90 (LCI 325d, 330d, 335d)
 2007-2009 BMW E60 (LCI Models: 530d, 535d, 535i, 540i, 550i)
 2007-2010 BMW E63 (LCI Models: 635d, 650i)
 2009-2012 BMW F01 (750i)
 2009-2012 BMW F02 (750Li)

Notes

See also 
 List of ZF transmissions

References 

6HP